Leiocithara angulata is a species of sea snail, a marine gastropod mollusc in the family Mangeliidae.

Description
The length of the shell attains 5 mm.

The whorls are sharply angulated, with a few sharp narrow longitudinal ribs, crossing the shoulder to the suture, no revolving striae. The shell is yellowish brown, lineated with pale chestnut.

Distribution
This marine species occurs off the Philippines and Queensland, Australia

References

 Reeve, L.A. 1846. Monograph of the genus Mangelia. pls 1–8 in Reeve, L.A. (ed). Conchologia Iconica. London : L. Reeve & Co. Vol. 3.

External links
  Hedley, C. 1922. A revision of the Australian Turridae. Records of the Australian Museum 13(6): 213-359, pls 42-56
  Tucker, J.K. 2004 Catalog of recent and fossil turrids (Mollusca: Gastropoda). Zootaxa 682:1-1295.
 Kilburn R.N. 1992. Turridae (Mollusca: Gastropoda) of southern Africa and Mozambique. Part 6. Subfamily Mangeliinae, section 1. Annals of the Natal Museum, 33: 461–575

angulata
Gastropods described in 1846